Goodenia arthrotricha is a species of flowering plant in the family Goodeniaceae and endemic to south-western Western Australia. It is an erect perennial, herb with linear to lance-shaped leaves with the narrower end towards the base, racemes of blue flowers with linear bracteoles at the base, and oval fruit.

Description

Taxonomy and naming
Goodenia arthrotricha was first formally described in 1868 by George Bentham in Flora Australiensis from specimens collected by James Drummond. The specific epithet (arthrotricha) means "jointed hair".

Distribution and habitat
This goodenia grows between granite rocks near Wannamal in the Avon Wheatbelt, Jarrah Forest and Swan Coastal Plain biogeographic regions in the south-west of Western Australia.

Conservation status
Goddenia arthrotricha is classified as "Threatened Flora (Declared Rare Flora — Extant)" by the Department of Environment and Conservation (Western Australia).

References

arthrotricha
Eudicots of Western Australia
Plants described in 1868
Taxa named by George Bentham